Love Story is a 1943 French romantic drama film directed by Claude Autant-Lara.

Plot
At the end of the 19th century, Irène was the governess of the young Douce de Bonafé and had the manager Fabien as a lover, with whom Douce was in love. Fabien would like to take Irene to Canada, but she is tempted by the idea of marrying the master of the house, a widower, Douce's father. She throws herself into Fabien's arms, who leaves with her and takes revenge on Irene and her masters, but he is gradually seduced by the young girl.

Douce is ready to live poor, far from France and her family, but not to replace her governess. She is about to return to her family when she tragically dies.

Cast
Odette Joyeux - Douce
Madeleine Robinson - Irène Comtat
Marguerite Moreno - Madame Bonafé
Jean Debucourt - Engelbert Bonafé
Roger Pigaut - Fabien Marani
Gabrielle Fontan - Estelle
Julienne Paroli - La vieille Thérèse
Georges Bever - Le frotteur

Production

References

External links

1943 romantic drama films
1943 films
Films directed by Claude Autant-Lara
Films set in the 19th century
French black-and-white films
Films with screenplays by Jean Aurenche
Films with screenplays by Pierre Bost
French romantic drama films
1940s French-language films
1940s French films